Navarro Ridge is a rugged ridge,  long, that extends from the Coombs Hills southeastward to the west side of Cambridge Glacier. It was named by the Advisory Committee on Antarctic Names in 2008 after members of the Navarro family who carried on support activities for the US Antarctic Program at the McMurdo, South Pole and Palmer Stations in the period 1989 to 2008: Kenneth Navarro, Palmer Station logistics supervisor who worked for 18 summer and four winter seasons at the three stations; Kenneth's wife Carol Gould Navarro, engaged in logistics and administration at Palmer and McMurdo for five summers and four winters; his sister Suzanne McCullough Navarro, a cook at McMurdo for four summers and one winter; his brother Steven Navarro, carpenter at Palmer and McMurdo for three summers and one winter; Kenneth and Carol's sons, Eliot Gould and Tyler Gould, also worked a few seasons in Antarctica.

References

Mountains of Victoria Land